Live! is a live album by guitarist Vinnie Moore, released on January 25, 2000 through Shrapnel Records.

Track listing

Personnel
Vinnie Moore – guitar, mixing, production
Wayne Findlay – guitar, keyboard
Shane Gaalaas – drums, percussion
Barry Sparks – bass
Mat Diamond – engineering
Paul Orofino – mixing, mastering

References

External links
In Review: Vinnie Moore "Vinnie Moore Live!" at Guitar Nine Records

Vinnie Moore albums
2000 live albums
Shrapnel Records albums